Lucius Marcius Philippus was a Roman politician who was elected suffect consul in 38 BC. He was step-brother to the future emperor Augustus.

Biography

A member of the plebeian branch of the Marcia family, Philippus was the son of Lucius Marcius Philippus, the consul of 56 BC. By 50 BC, he had possibly become an Augur, one of the priests of ancient Rome.  In 49 BC he was elected as Plebeian Tribune, where he vetoed the proposal to send Faustus Sulla, Pompey’s son-in-law, as propraetor to Mauretania, to persuade kings Bocchus II and Bogud to side with Pompey and abandon Julius Caesar.  In 44 BC he was elected praetor, and although he was granted a province to administer after his term had finished, he refused to accept the validity of the allotment of provinces agreed to in a Senate meeting of November 28, 44 BC.

With his father's marriage to Atia, he became step-brother to Gaius Octavius, Julius Caesar's heir. His father used his influence to help Philippus to obtain the consulate as one of the suffect consuls of 38 BC; nevertheless, during his consulate Philippus did not declare himself openly for his step-brother in his rivalry with Mark Antony. By 35 BC, he was appointed the proconsular governor of one of the two provinces of Hispania. After serving there for two years, he returned to Rome, where he was awarded a triumph which he celebrated on April 27, 33 BC for his actions while governor. With the spoils of his victories, he restored the temple of Hercules and the Muses in the Circus Flaminius.

Philippus did not appear to have any living sons to succeed him. Philippus married Atia, daughter of Julia Minor and Marcus Atius Balbus and maternal aunt of Augustus. She bore him a daughter Marcia, who later married Paullus Fabius Maximus. Marcia had one son and possibly one daughter: Paullus Fabius Persicus and Fabia Numantina, who may have been the daughter of Maximus' brother Africanus Fabius Maximus.

See also
 List of Roman consuls

Notes

Sources
 T. Robert S. Broughton, The Magistrates of the Roman Republic, Vol II (1952).
 Syme, Ronald, The Roman Revolution (1939)
 Holmes, T. Rice, The Roman Republic and the Founder of the Empire, Vol. III (1923)

1st-century BC Roman augurs
1st-century BC Roman consuls
Lucius consul 716 AUC
Family of Augustus